Thomas Spicer Curlett (1847 – May 7, 1914) was a Republican farmer, postmaster and state legislator in Lancaster County, Virginia during Reconstruction.

Early and family life
He was born in Baltimore. His father, John Curlett (died February 17, 1896), was a bank director and philanthropist. He was a student at Loyola College in Baltimore in 1864. On November 4, 1868, he married Susie Spicer (1849-1933) of Lancaster County, who would survive him, as would their son John (1870-1944), who would also serve in the Virginia House of Delegates beginning in 1906 and also act as an oyster inspector.

Career
During the American Civil War, Spicer was a private in Company B of the Maryland Volunteers Eastern Shore Infantry. A photograph of him in uniform sold at auction.

On January 6, 1874, he became the postmaster for Litwalton in the Whitechapel district of Lancaster County. Spicer represented Lancaster County in the Virginia House of Delegates from 1875 to 1879, until census reorganization combined it with nearby Richmond County. He represented both counties 1885 to 1887. In 1888-1889 he was one of the principal farmers in the Litwalton division of the county. The Chesapeake Watchman lampooned his candidacy and denounced his previous affiliation with Republicans. Henry Straughan Hathaway who owned Enon Hall wrote to him denouncing his political affiliation with blacks.

Curlett may have returned to Baltimore by 1894 and worked as a salesman, though his wife and son remained in Lancaster County, Virginia. He died on May 7, 1914 in Baltimore.

References

People from Lancaster County, Virginia
19th-century American politicians
Republican Party members of the Virginia House of Delegates
1847 births
1914 deaths